WJOK (1050 AM) is a Roman Catholic Christian formatted radio station licensed to Kaukauna, Wisconsin, that serves the Green Bay and Appleton-Oshkosh areas. The station is owned by the Green Bay-based Relevant Radio network.

The station originally signed on as WKAU in a Top 40 format. In 1984, the station was sold to Quinn Martin of Milwaukee who changed the call letters to his initials, WQWM, and made it an oldies music format. The station changed hands again in 1993 to a new ownership who changed the calls to WSGC and the format to "Positive Country" music. Another sale in 1999 resulted in the station becoming all-sports "1050 The Jock, WJOK," which carried programming from the national Sports Fan Radio Network as well as local broadcasts of Wisconsin Timber Rattlers baseball. WJOK was purchased by Starboard Broadcasting in 2000, and the station joined Starboard's Relevant Radio network on November 26 of that year.

External links

JOK
Catholic radio stations
Radio stations established in 1965
1965 establishments in Wisconsin
Relevant Radio stations